The Fala Hydro Power Plant (also Fala Hydroelectric Power Plant or Fala HPP) is a Run-of-the-river hydroelectricity in Slovenia. The ROR is located in the Drava river in Selnica ob Dravi.

The Hidroelektrarna Fala started in 1918 and is the oldest ROR in the Drava river.

See also
List of power stations in Slovenia

References

Drava
Hydroelectric power stations in Slovenia
Run-of-the-river power stations